The dancesport competition at the 2022 World Games took place from 8 to 10 July 2022, in Birmingham in United States, at Sloss Furnaces and the Legacy Arena.
Originally scheduled to take place in July 2021, the Games were rescheduled for July 2022 as a result of the 2020 Summer Olympics postponement due to the COVID-19 pandemic.
 This was the first time when breaking, which is set to be an official event to be contested at the 2024 Summer Olympics, was a part of the World Games programme.

Qualification

Medal table

Medalists

References

External links
 The World Games 2022
 World DanceSport Federation
 Results book – DanceSports
 Results book – DanceSports Breaking

 
2022 World Games